Kiselevsky (masculine), Kiselevskaya (feminine), or Kiselevskoye (neuter) is the name of several rural localities in Arkhangelsk Oblast, Russia:
Kiselevskaya, Kargopolsky District, Arkhangelsk Oblast, a village in Pechnikovsky Selsoviet of Kargopolsky District
Kiselevskaya, Shenkursky District, Arkhangelsk Oblast, a village in Verkhopadengsky Selsoviet of Shenkursky District